Novosedly is a municipality and village in Strakonice District in the South Bohemian Region of the Czech Republic. It has about 300 inhabitants.

Notable people
Paulina Skavova (born 1976), sculptor; lives and works here

References

Villages in Strakonice District